Charles Addington Hanbury  (bapt. 16 September 1828 – 13 December 1900) was an English brewer from the Hanbury brewing family and a master of the Brewers' Company in 1857.

Family
Hanbury was born in Upper Clapton, Hackney, London, to Robert Hanbury, a partner for more than 50 years in the brewers Truman, Hanbury, Buxton & Co., and his wife, Emily Hall Hanbury.

In 1853, he married Christine Isabella MacKenzie in Inverness. One of their sons was the geographer, traveller and author, David Theophilus Hanbury.

Career
In 1859, Hanbury was commissioned as a lieutenant in the 12th Middlesex Rifle Volunteers, a unit got up by Wilbraham Taylor of Hadley Hurst, a gentleman usher to Queen Victoria who became a captain in the unit. They had premises in High Street, Barnet.

Around 1861, he bought Mount Pleasant in East Barnet.

The London Metropolitan Archives contain a number of leases entered into by Hanbury in the 1880s on behalf of Truman, Hanbury, Buxton & Co.

Death
Hanbury died in a riding accident when he was thrown from his horse and broke his neck while hunting with the Warwickshire Hounds at Grandborough near Rugby.

References 

1828 births
Date of birth missing
1900 deaths
English brewers
People from Upper Clapton
English justices of the peace
Volunteer Force officers in Middlesex units
19th-century English businesspeople